Cordova may refer to:

Places

Former states 
Emirate of Cordova (756–929)
Caliphate of Cordova (929–1031)
Taifa of Cordova (1031–1091)

Argentina
Córdoba, Argentina, capital of Córdoba Province
Córdoba Province, Argentina

Colombia 
Córdoba Department

Mexico 
Córdoba, Veracruz

Peru 
Córdova District, Huaytará Province

Philippines 
Cordova, Cebu

Spain
Córdoba, Spain, a city in Spain which is called in English as Cordova.
Province of Córdoba (Spain), in Andalusia

United States
Cordova, Alabama, a city
Cordova, Alaska, a city
Cordova Bay, Alaska
Cordova Township, Rock Island County, Illinois
Cordova, Illinois, a village in Rock Island County
Cordova, Kentucky, an unincorporated community
Cordova, Maryland, a village
Cordova, Minnesota, an unincorporated community
Cordova Township, Le Sueur County, Minnesota
Cordova, Nebraska, a village
Cordova, New Mexico, an unincorporated community and census-designated place
Cordova, North Carolina, an unincorporated community and census-designated place 
Cordova, South Carolina, a town
Cordova, Tennessee
Cordova, West Virginia, an unincorporated community

Other uses
 Cordova (surname)
 Apache Cordova, a mobile software development framework
 Cordova Mall, in Pensacola, Florida
 Cordova Rebellion, an 1839 uprising in Texas
 USS Cordova, an escort carrier of the United States Navy, later transferred to the Royal Navy
 Cordova Hotel, in St. Augustine, Florida

See also
 Córdoba (disambiguation)
 Cordova Airport (disambiguation)
 Cordova High School (disambiguation)
 De Córdova (disambiguation)